Leilua is the surname of the following people
Bianca Leilua, competitive sailor from Samoa
Joseph Leilua (born 1991), Australian rugby league footballer
Luciano Leilua (born 1996), Australian rugby league footballer, brother of Joseph
Uiliami Leilua Vi (1925–1986), Tongan noble